An Introduction to Islamic Finance is a book written by Pakistani scholar Taqi Usmani on Islamic banking and finance. The book remains one of the gateway publications on Islamic finance. Most of the focus of the book is on banking rather than fund management. The author urges Islamic banks to develop their own culture, as ultimately it is the value system that matters. The book displays Usmani's pragmatism, and the clarity of the solutions offered which he believes to be Sharia compliant.

Presentation 
The book was completed on 9 June 1998, as indicated at the end of the author's introduction, and was published several times in paper format:
Karachi: Idara Isha'at-e-Diniyat (P) Ltd. (1 January 1999).
Netherlands: Kluwer Law International (1 January 2001), in Arab and Islamic Laws Series.
Karachi: Maktaba maāriful qur'an (2002).

The book has been translated and published in Urdu:
Islamī binkārī kī yunādī, translated by Muḥammad Zāhid, Fayṣal Abād: Maktabat al-Ārifī, 1428H.

In addition, the book has just been translated and published in Arabic:
Muqddima fī al-tamwīl al-islāmī, translated by Umar Aḥmad Kashkār, Damascus: Dār al-Rawād, 2019.

An electronic version of the book is available online on the author's official website. This online publication makes the book accessible to the general public far from the geographical boundaries or logistical constraints that may stand against the acquisition of a paper version of the book.

Content 
This book is not an original writing but rather a compilation of articles and conference papers as the author states in his introduction. The author begins his work with an introductory chapter presenting the characteristics of Islamic economic thought, the relationship between the human, the divine and the money, and a critique of the capitalist economy. He has taken care to cover all the contracts of Islamic finance, each with a dedicated article in order to produce this book. Each chapter dedicated to a contract explains its legal regime in classical Islamic law and its use and role in the Islamic banking, finance and insurance industry. One chapter is dedicated to Islamic funds and another to the principle of limited liability in Islamic law.

Mohyedine HAJJAR wrote,

Writing Style 
The language of the text is reasonably understandable and intended for the general public. A novice reader who is not familiar with the financial world would have no trouble accessing the substance of the text. This is an asset for this book as it meets the needs of the target audience.

Mohyedine HAJJAR wrote,

Bibliography 
In the official electronic version, the footnote numbering is continuous in each chapter and starts over in the following chapter. This indicates the bibliographical independence between chapters of the book.

Mohyedine HAJJAR wrote,

Reception 
Mohyedine HAJJAR wrote,

See also 
Muhammad Taqi Usmani bibliography

References

External links 

1998 non-fiction books
Pakistani books
Books by Muhammad Taqi Usmani
Deobandi fiqh literature
1998 books
Islamic banking